Opera seria (plural: opere serie; usually called dramma per musica or melodramma serio) is an Italian musical term which refers to the noble and "serious" style of Italian opera that predominated in Europe from the 1710s to about 1770. The term itself was rarely used at the time and only attained common usage once opera seria was becoming unfashionable and beginning to be viewed as something of a historical genre. The popular rival to opera seria was opera buffa, the 'comic' opera that took its cue from the improvisatory commedia dell'arte.

Italian opera seria (invariably to Italian libretti) was produced not only in Italy but almost throughout Europe, and beyond (see Opera in Latin America, Opera in Cuba e. g.). Among the main centres in Europe were the court operas based in Warsaw (since 1628), Munich (founded in 1653), London (established in 1662), Vienna (firmly established 1709; first operatic representation: Il pomo d'oro, 1668), Dresden (since 1719) as well as other German residences, Saint Petersburg (Italian opera reached Russia in 1731, first opera venues followed ), Madrid (see Spanish opera), and Lisbon. Opera seria was less popular in France, where the national genre of French opera (or tragédie en musique) was preferred.

Acclaimed composers of opera seria included Antonio Caldara, Alessandro Scarlatti, George Frideric Handel, Antonio Vivaldi, Nicola Porpora, Leonardo Vinci, Johann Adolph Hasse, Leonardo Leo, Baldassare Galuppi, Francesco Feo, Giovanni Battista Pergolesi and in the second half of the 18th century Christoph Willibald Gluck, Niccolò Jommelli, Tommaso Traetta, Josef Mysliveček, Joseph Haydn, Johann Christian Bach, Carl Heinrich Graun, Antonio Salieri, Antonio Sacchini, Giuseppe Sarti, Niccolò Piccinni, Giovanni Paisiello, Domenico Cimarosa, and Wolfgang Amadeus Mozart. By far the most successful librettist of the era was Metastasio, others were Apostolo Zeno, Benedetto Pamphili, Silvio Stampiglia, Antonio Salvi, Pietro Pariati, Pietro Ottoboni, Stefano Benedetto Pallavicino, Nicola Francesco Haym, Domenico Lalli, Paolo Antonio Rolli, Giovanni Claudio Pasquini, Ranieri de' Calzabigi and Giovanni Ambrogio Migliavacca.

Structure 
Opera seria built upon the conventions of the High Baroque era by developing and exploiting the da capo aria, with its A–B–A form. The first section presented a theme, the second a complementary one, and the third a repeat of the first with ornamentation and elaboration of the music by the singer. As the genre developed and arias grew longer, a typical opera seria would contain not more than thirty musical movements.

A typical opera would start with an instrumental overture of three movements (fast-slow-fast) and then a series of recitatives containing dialogue interspersed with arias expressing the emotions of the character, this pattern only broken by the occasional duet for the leading amatory couple. The recitative was typically secco: that is, accompanied only by continuo (usually harpsichord, theorbo, and cello, sometimes supported by further bass and chordal instruments). At moments of especially violent passion secco was replaced by stromentato (or accompagnato) recitative, where the singer was accompanied by the entire body of strings. After an aria was sung, accompanied by strings and oboe (and sometimes with horns or flutes), the character usually exited the stage, encouraging the audience to applaud. This continued for three acts before concluding with an upbeat chorus, to celebrate the jubilant climax. The leading singers each expected their fair share of arias of varied mood, be they sad, angry, heroic or meditative.

The dramaturgy of opera seria developed largely as a response to French criticism of what were often viewed as impure and corrupting librettos. As response, the Rome-based Academy of Arcadia sought to return Italian opera to what they viewed as neoclassical principles, obeying the classical unities of drama, defined by Aristotle, and replacing "immoral" plots, such as Busenello's for L'incoronazione di Poppea, with highly moral narratives that aimed to instruct, as well as entertain. However, the often tragic endings of classical drama were rejected out of a sense of decorum: early writers of opera seria librettos such as Apostolo Zeno felt that virtue should be rewarded and shown triumphant, while the antagonists were to be put on their way to remorse. The spectacle and ballet, so common in French opera, were banished.

Voices 
The age of opera seria corresponded with the rise to prominence of the castrati, often prodigiously gifted male singers who had undergone castration before puberty in order to retain a high, powerful soprano or alto voice backed by decades of rigorous musical training. They were cast in heroic male roles, alongside another new breed of operatic creature, the prima donna. The rise of these star singers with formidable technical skills spurred composers to write increasingly complex vocal music, and many operas of the time were written as vehicles for specific singers. Of these the most famous is perhaps Farinelli, whose debut in 1722 was guided by Nicola Porpora. Though Farinelli did not sing for Handel, his main rival, Senesino, did.

1720–1740 

Opera seria acquired definitive form early during the 1720s. While Apostolo Zeno and Alessandro Scarlatti had paved the way, the genre only truly came to fruition due to Metastasio and later composers. Metastasio's career began with the serenata Gli orti esperidi ("The Gardens of the Hesperides"). Nicola Porpora, (much later to be Haydn's master), set the work to music, and the success was so great that the famed Roman prima donna, Marianna Bulgarelli, "La Romanina", sought out Metastasio, and took him on as her protégé. Under her wing, Metastasio produced libretto after libretto, and they were rapidly set by the greatest composers in Italy and Austria, establishing the transnational tone of opera seria: Didone abbandonata, Catone in Utica, Ezio, Alessandro nelle Indie, Semiramide riconosciuta, Siroe and Artaserse. After 1730 he was settled in Vienna and turned out more librettos for the imperial theater, until the mid-1740s: Adriano in Siria, Demetrio, Demofoonte, Olimpiade, La clemenza di Tito, Achille in Sciro, Temistocle, Il re pastore and what he regarded as his finest libretto, . For the librettos, Metastasio and his imitators customarily drew on dramas featuring classical characters from antiquity bestowed with princely values and morality, struggling with conflicts between love, honour and duty, in elegant and ornate language that could be performed equally well as both opera and non-musical drama. On the other hand, Handel, working far outside the mainstream genre, set only a few Metastasio libretti for his London audience, preferring a greater diversity of texts.

At this time the leading Metastasian composers were Hasse, Caldara, Vinci, Porpora, and Pergolesi. Vinci's settings of Didone abbandonata and Artaserse were much praised for their stromento recitative, and he played a crucial part in establishing the new style of melody. Hasse, by contrast, indulged in stronger accompaniment and was regarded at the time as the more adventurous of the two. Pergolesi was noted for his lyricism. The main challenge for all was achieving variety, a break from the pattern of recitativo secco and aria da capo. The mutable moods of Metastasio's librettos helped, as did innovations made by the composer, such as stromento recitative or cutting a ritornello. During this period the choice of keys to reflect certain emotions became standardized: D minor became the choice key for a composer's typical "rage" aria, while D major for pomp and bravura, G minor for pastoral effect and E flat for pathetic effect, became the usual options.

1740–1770 

After peaking during the 1750s, the popularity of the Metastasian model began to wane. New trends, popularized by composers such as Niccolò Jommelli and Tommaso Traetta, began to seep into opera seria. The Italianate pattern of alternating, sharply-contrasted recitative and aria began to give way to ideas from the French operatic tradition. Jommelli's works from 1740 onwards increasingly favored accompanied recitative and greater dynamic contrast, as well as a more prominent role for the orchestra while limiting virtuosic vocal displays. Traetta reintroduced the ballet in his operas and restored the tragic, melodramatic endings of classical dramas. His operas, particularly after 1760, also gave a larger role to the chorus.

The culmination of these reforms arrived in the operas of Christoph Willibald Gluck. Beginning with Orfeo ed Euridice (1762), Gluck drastically cut back on the possibilities for vocal virtuosity afforded to singers, abolished secco recitative (thereby heavily reducing the delineation between aria and recitative), and took great care to unify drama, dance, music, and theatrical practice in the synthesis of Italian and French traditions. He continued his reform with Alceste (1767) and Paride ed Elena (1770). Gluck paid great attention to orchestration and considerably increased the role of the chorus: he also cut back heavily on exit arias. The labyrinthine subplots that had riddled earlier baroque opera were eliminated. In 1768, the year after Gluck's Alceste, Jommelli and his librettist Verazi produced Fetonte. Ensemble and chorus are predominant: the usual number of exit arias slashed in half. For the most part, however, these trends did not become mainstream until the 1790s, and the Metastasian model continued to dominate.

1770–1800 

Gluck's reforms made most of the composers of opera seria of the previous decades obsolete. The careers of Hasse, Jommelli, Galuppi, and Traetta were effectively finished. Replacing them came a new wave of composers such as Wolfgang Amadeus Mozart, Joseph Haydn, Johann Christian Bach, Carl Heinrich Graun, Antonio Salieri (a disciple of Gluck), Antonio Sacchini, Giuseppe Sarti, Niccolò Piccinni, Giovanni Paisiello and Domenico Cimarosa. The popularity of the aria da capo began to fade, replaced by the rondò. Orchestras grew in size, arias lengthened, ensembles became more prominent, and obbligato recitative became both common and more elaborate. While throughout the 1780s Metastasio's libretti still dominated the repertory, a new group of Venetian librettists pushed opera seria in a new direction. The work of Gaetano Sertor and the group surrounding him finally broke the absolute dominance of the singers and gave opera seria a new impetus towards the spectacular and the dramatic elements of 19th-century Romantic opera. Tragic endings, on-stage death and regicide became the norm rather than the exception. By the final decade of the century opera seria as it had been traditionally defined was essentially dead, and the political upheavals that the French Revolution inspired swept it away once and for all.

Social context
With a few exceptions, opera seria was the opera of the court, of the monarchy and the nobility. This is not a universal picture: Handel in London composed not for the court but for a much more socially diverse audience, and in the Venetian republic composers modified their operas to suit the public taste and not that of the court. But for the most part, opera seria was synonymous with court opera. This brought with it a number of conditions: the court, and particularly the monarch, required that their own nobility be reflected on the stage. Opera seria plot-lines are heavily shaped by this criterion: Il re pastore displays the glory of Alexander the Great, while La clemenza di Tito does the same for the Roman emperor Titus. The potentate in the audience would watch his counterparts from the ancient world and see their benevolent autocracy redound to his own credit.

Many aspects of the staging contributed to this effect: both the auditorium and stage were lit during performances, while the sets mirrored almost exactly the architecture of the palace hosting the opera. Sometimes the links between opera and audience were even closer: Gluck's serenata Il Parnaso confuso was first performed at Vienna with a cast consisting of members of the royal family. However, with the French Revolution came serious political upheavals across Italy, and as new, more egalitarian republics were established and old autocracies fell away, the Arcadian ideals of opera seria seemed increasingly irrelevant. Rulers were no longer free from violent deaths, and under new social ideals the hierarchy of singers broke down. Such significant socio-political change meant that opera seria, so closely allied to the ruling class, was finished.

References

Notes

Cited sources

Further reading
 Brown, J. Letters upon the Poetry and Music of the Italian Opera. London 1789, 21791.
 Burt, Nathaniel. "Opera in Arcadia", The Musical Quarterly, xli (1955), pp. 145–70.
 Dean, Winton Handel and the Opera Seria. Berkeley 1969.
 Dent, E. J. "Ensembles and Finales in 18th Century Italian Opera", Sammelbände der Internationalen Musikgesellschaft xi (1909–10), 543–69, xii (1910–11), pp. 112–38.
 Dent, E. J. "Italian Opera in the Eighteenth Century, and its Influence on the Music of the Classical Period", Sammelbände der Internationalen Musikgesellschaft, xiv (1912–13), p. 500.
 Downes, E. O., "The Neapolitan Tradition in Opera", International Musicological Society: Congress Report, viii New York 1961, i, pp. 277–84
 Feldman, M. Opera and Sovereignty: Transforming Myths in Eighteenth Century Italy, University of Chicago Press, 2007.
 Heartz, Daniel. "Opera and the Periodization of 18th-century Music", International Musicological Society: Congress Report, Ljubjana 1967, pp. 160–68.
 Lee, V. [V. Paget], Studies of the Eighteenth Century in Italy, London 1880, 21907.
 McClymonds, Marita P. "The Venetian Role In the Transformation of Italian Opera Seria during the 1790s", I vicini di Mozart: Venice 1987, pp. 221–40.
 Robinson, Michael F. "The Aria in Opera Seria, 1725–1780", Proceedings of the Royal Musical Association, lxxxviii (1961–2), pp. 31–43.
 Warrack, John & West, Ewan. The Oxford Dictionary of Opera. 1992, .

 
European court festivities
Opera genres
Italian opera terminology